This article describes the history of West Indies cricket from 1991 to 2000.

Outstanding players during this period were Brian Lara, Courtney Walsh, Curtly Ambrose and Jimmy Adams.

Domestic cricket 1990–91 to 2000

Shell Shield winners
 1990–91 Barbados
 1991–92 Jamaica
 1992–93 Guyana
 1993–94 Leeward Islands
 1994–95 Barbados
 1995–96 Leeward Islands
 1996–97 Barbados
 1997–98 Leeward Islands shared with Guyana
 1998–99 Barbados
 1999–2000 Jamaica

International tours 1990–91 to 2000

Australia 1990–91

1st Test at Sabina Park, Kingston – match drawn
2nd Test at Bourda, Georgetown – West Indies won by 10 wickets
3rd Test at Queen's Park Oval, Port of Spain, Trinidad – match drawn
4th Test at Kensington Oval, Bridgetown, Barbados – West Indies won by 343 runs
5th Test at Antigua Recreation Ground, St John's – Australia won by 157 runs

South Africa 1991–92

1st Test at Kensington Oval, Bridgetown, Barbados – West Indies won by 52 runs

Pakistan 1992–93

1st Test at Queen's Park Oval, Port of Spain, Trinidad – West Indies won by 204 runs
2nd Test at Kensington Oval, Bridgetown, Barbados – West Indies won by 10 wickets
3rd Test at Antigua Recreation Ground, St John's – match drawn

England 1993–94

1st Test at Sabina Park, Kingston – West Indies won by 8 wickets
2nd Test at Bourda, Georgetown – West Indies won by an innings and 44 runs
3rd Test at Queen's Park Oval, Port of Spain, Trinidad – West Indies won by 147 runs
4th Test at Kensington Oval, Bridgetown, Barbados – England won by 208 runs
5th Test at Antigua Recreation Ground, St John's – match drawn

Australia 1994–95

The West Indians went into the series having not lost a series in 15 years.

1st Test at Kensington Oval, Bridgetown, Barbados – Australia won by 10 wickets.  The tourists' underdog status was amplified by pre-Test injuries to fast bowlers Craig McDermott and Damien Fleming.  "Still, we somehow managed to catch them on the hop", wrote Paul Reiffel. Victory was secured within 3 days.
2nd Test at Antigua Recreation Ground, St John's – match drawn.
3rd Test at Queen's Park Oval, Port of Spain, Trinidad – West Indies won by 9 wickets.  Having endured substantial criticism from an enraged fourth estate for their lustreless display in the First Test, Curtly Ambrose and Courtney Walsh, the Caribbean's last great fast-bowling pair, lifted the ante and biffed the Australians with a barrage of short-pitched bowling.  It was, wrote Reiffel, "one of the greenest wickets I ever saw". Steve Waugh knocked up a courageous 63 in the first innings, priming him for his legendary effort in Jamaica.
4th Test at Sabina Park, Kingston – Australia won by an innings and 53 runs.  The final Test arrived with the scoreline one-all, and the crowd came out in force.  "They were noisy, knew their cricket, and could be intimidating if you gave them room", Reiffel recalled.  "[T]he bowl was resounding in anticipation [...]." The Australian strategy was to occupy the crease and compile as large a total as possible, fearing the fourth-innings pitch.  Steve Waugh, coming in at 73 for three, joined his brother Mark, "batted magnificently and built a fortress strong enough to keep West Indies at bay.  Mark nonchalantly scored a beautiful century before getting out, but by then he had helped Steve build a solid platform." Inspired by Waugh's intrepid double century and the West Indies' depleted psychological funds, Reiffel picked up three quick wickets on the second-last evening.  By the reckoning of Reiffel, it was this match – and, more specifically, Waugh's century, "one of the greatest feats of batting I ever witnessed" – which signified the transition of cricketing supremacy from the West Indies to Australia.  It also secured the Frank Worrell Trophy.

New Zealand 1995–96

1st Test at Kensington Oval, Bridgetown, Barbados – West Indies won by 10 wickets
2nd Test at Antigua Recreation Ground, St John's – match drawn

India 1996–97

1st Test at Sabina Park, Kingston – match drawn
2nd Test at Queen's Park Oval, Port of Spain, Trinidad – match drawn
3rd Test at Kensington Oval, Bridgetown, Barbados – West Indies won by 38 runs
4th Test at Antigua Recreation Ground, St John's – match drawn
5th Test at Bourda, Georgetown – match drawn

Sri Lanka 1996–97

1st Test at Antigua Recreation Ground, St John's – West Indies won by 6 wickets
2nd Test at Arnos Vale Ground, Kingstown – match drawn

England 1997–98

1st Test at Sabina Park, Kingston – match drawn
2nd Test at Queen's Park Oval, Port of Spain, Trinidad – West Indies won by 3 wickets
3rd Test at Queen's Park Oval, Port of Spain, Trinidad – England won by 3 wickets
4th Test at Bourda, Georgetown – West Indies won by 242 runs
5th Test at Kensington Oval, Bridgetown, Barbados – match drawn
 [ 6th Test] at Antigua Recreation Ground, St John's – West Indies won by an innings and 52 runs

Australia 1998–99 CI Link

1st Test at Queen's Park Oval, Port of Spain, Trinidad – Australia won by 312 runs
2nd Test at Sabina Park, Kingston – West Indies won by 10 wickets
3rd Test at Kensington Oval, Bridgetown, Barbados – West Indies won by 1 wicket
4th Test at Antigua Recreation Ground, St John's – Australia won by 176 runs

Zimbabwe 1999–2000

1st Test at Queen's Park Oval, Port of Spain, Trinidad – West Indies won by 35 runs
2nd Test at Sabina Park, Kingston – West Indies won by 10 wickets

Pakistan 1999–2000

1st Test at Bourda, Georgetown – match drawn
2nd Test at Kensington Oval, Bridgetown, Barbados – match drawn
3rd Test at Antigua Recreation Ground, St John's – West Indies won by 1 wicket

See also
 Wisden Cricketers' Almanack

Notes

External sources
 CricketArchive – itinerary of events

1990-91 to 2000
 1990-91 to 2000